John Howlett is an English author and screenwriter

John Howlett may also refer to:

John Howlett (cricketer) (1868–1931), Australian cricketer
John Howlett (political economist) (1731–1804), English political economist and cleric